TDW (Gesellschaft für verteidigungstechnische Wirksysteme mbH) is a European company that develops and manufactures warheads for guided weapons. The company was founded in 1994 and has 130 employees based in Schrobenhausen, Germany. TDW is a 100% subsidiary of MBDA Deutschland GmbH and part of the European guided weapon group MBDA.

History 
The history of what is now TDW began in the 1960s at the site in Schrobenhausen where the company has been located ever since. The business started as part of Bölkow, later Messerschmitt-Bölkow-Blohm (MBB) before it became DASA. TDW as a separate legal entity was founded 1994 as a spin-off of DASA, which continued to control the business as subsidiary. All missile activities of DASA and Dornier GmbH 1995 were consolidated into LFK-Lenkflugkörpersysteme GmbH which owned 100% of TDW. Together with LFK, TDW has been consolidated into EADS (now Airbus) which has sold LFK GmbH and its subsidiary TDW, to the European missile group MBDA in 2006. LFK GmbH has changed its company name to MBDA Deutschland GmbH in 2012. TDW was identified as one of few assets of in the Critical Foreign Dependencies Initiative.

Products 

TDW has customers in France, Germany, Norway, Sweden, Turkey, the UK, and the United States. The product portfolio of TDW encompasses all sorts of conventional warheads, blast/fragmentation and lethality-enhancers for air defence, penetrators for bunker-busting and anti-ship application, shaped charges to defeat tanks and multi-effect warheads to defeat several target categories. In 2013 a newly developed Mk82 warhead was demonstrated with a novel scalable technology that is able to adjust the explosive effect to a level appropriate to the military target, minimizing collateral damage. The Programmable Intelligent Multi Purpose Fuze (PIMPF) is a void sensing and layer counting fuze in service with the warheads of NSM and Taurus.

TDW products can be found in:

Anti-tank 
 MILAN 1, MILAN 2, MILAN 2T, MILAN 3
 HOT, HOT-2, HOT-3
 PARS 3 LR (formerly TRIGAT LR)
 Brimstone 2

Anti-air 
 ALARM
 Roland 
 Sidewinder / RAM
 PAC-3 (lethality enhancer)
 ASRAAM
 ESSM
 Mistral
 METEOR
 CAMM (missile family)

Anti-ship 
 AS.34 Kormoran, Kormoran-2
 NSM
 RBS15 Mk3

Tandem penetrators 
 STABO runway cratering submunition for MW-1
 MEPHISTO for the Taurus KEPD 350

Torpedoes 
 Sting Ray Mod 1
 Spearfish Upgrade

Fuzes 
 PIMPF

References

External links
www.tdw-warhead-systems.com

Defence companies of Germany